"Let's Get Crazy" is a song recorded by American singer Cassie. It features a guest appearance from American singer Akon, who co-wrote the song with Bilal Hajji, Kinnda Hamid and RedOne, with the latter also helming the song's production.

The single impacted rhythmic contemporary radio stations in the United States on August 10, 2009, and was initially digitally released on September 1, 2009, through Bad Boy in association with Atlantic Records. It peaked at number thirty-three on the US Billboard Rhythmic chart.

A reworked version of the song titled "Party Rock Remix," featuring American hip hop-electronic dance music duo LMFAO, premiered shortly after the singer moved to Interscope Records with the Bad Boy roster in late 2009. Despite Cassie originally hinting a music video shoot was being planned, accompanying visuals were not released for the track.

Background and release
Cassie started working on her sophomore album in 2007, with producers Kanye West, Pharrell Williams and Ryan Leslie, who co-wrote and produced her 2006 self-titled debut album, which spawned the number three Billboard Hot 100 hit "Me & U." In the following year, Cassie released "Is It You" for the soundtrack album of the dance film Step Up 2: The Streets, in which she also co-starred as Sophie Donovan, and a single titled "Official Girl," featuring Lil Wayne. On April 14, 2009, Bad Boy Records released the single "Must Be Love," featuring Puff Daddy, tentatively a part of her upcoming second studio album Electro Love.

It was then announced that yet another new single, "Let's Get Crazy," featuring Akon, would be impacting rhythmic contemporary radio in the US on August 10, 2009. The track had previously been leaked in March 2009, as various other demos from the project's recording sessions were also surfacing online around that time. Cassie talked about working with Akon on it during a radio interview in June 2009, calling him "super creative, I can't even explain it [...] he's got a great vibe, fun to work with," expressing interest in doing another collaboration.

"Let's Get Crazy" was then made available for digital download on September 1, 2009, with a promotional CD single distributed later that year, through NextSelection, Bad Boy Records, and Interscope Records, marking Cassie's first release by the latter since her record deal signing. Wonderland described it as a "more standard-issue club banger," in comparison to her previous singles. AXS listed it as one of Cassie's ten most notable songs, in 2015, with a writer for the website commenting: "Cassie spreads the magic of her vocals with Akon in this song. You hear Akon in the back constantly [...] The beat is something to dance to [and it is] like a pop song."

Remixes
A number of remixes were commissioned for the single's release, including an official reworked version of the song, the Party Rock remix featuring American hip hop-electronic dance music duo LMFAO. A Blue Ice Trance Edit also surfaced online while Philadelphia DJ Benja Styles teamed up with rapper Ness to remix "Let's Get Crazy."

Track listing
Digital download
"Let's Get Crazy" (featuring Akon) – 3:56

Promo CD single
"Let's Get Crazy" (featuring Akon) (LMFAO Remix) – 3:16
"Let's Get Crazy" (featuring Akon) (LMFAO Remix Instrumental) – 3:15
"Let's Get Crazy" (featuring Akon) (Main) – 3:57
"Let's Get Crazy" (featuring Akon) (Main Instrumental) – 3:57

Credits and personnel
Credits adapted from Qobuz, ASCAP and the liner notes of Let's Get Crazy.
Locations
 Recorded at Daddy's House Recording Studio, New York City, and Chalice Recording Studio and 2nd Floor Studios, Los Angeles
 Mixed at Larrabee Studios, Los Angeles

Personnel

 Cassie – vocals, background vocals, primary artist
 Akon – vocals, background vocals, featured artist, songwriter
 Bilal "The Chef" Hajji – songwriter
 Kinnda "Kee" Hamid – songwriter, background vocals
 RedOne – producer, programming, instruments, songwriter, vocal arranger
 Dave Pensado – mixing
 Jaycen Joshua – mixing
 Giancarlo Lino – mixing assistant
 Matthew Testa – assistant engineer
 Mike Donaldson – assistant engineer
 Party Rock (GoonRock, Redfoo) – remix producer

Charts

Release history

References

2009 singles
2009 songs
Akon songs
Bad Boy Records singles
Cassie Ventura songs
Dance-pop songs
Eurodance songs
Songs about dancing
Song recordings produced by RedOne
Songs written by Akon
Songs written by Bilal Hajji
Songs written by Kinnda
Songs written by RedOne